Pittman is an unincorporated community and census-designated place (CDP) in Lake County, Florida, United States. The population was 180 at the 2010 census. It is part of the Orlando–Kissimmee Metropolitan Statistical Area.

Geography
Pittman is located in northern Lake County and is bordered to the west by Marion County, to the east by Lake Dorr, and to the north by Ocala National Forest. Florida State Road 19 passes through the community, leading south  to Eustis and north  to Palatka.

Demographics

As of the census of 2000, there were 192 people, 69 households, and 58 families residing in the CDP. The racial makeup of the CDP was 83.85% White, 11.98% African American, 2.60% from other races, and 1.56% from two or more races. Hispanic or Latino of any race were 5.21% of the population.

There were 69 households, out of which 34.8% had children under the age of 18 living with them, 66.7% were married couples living together, 8.7% had a female householder with no husband present, and 15.9% were non-families. 15.9% of all households were made up of individuals, and 10.1% had someone living alone who was 65 years of age or older.  The average household size was 2.78 and the average family size was 2.97.

In the CDP, the population was spread out, with 23.4% under the age of 18, 12.5% from 18 to 24, 23.4% from 25 to 44, 29.2% from 45 to 64, and 11.5% who were 65 years of age or older.  The median age was 37 years. For every 100 females, there were 118.2 males.  For every 100 females age 18 and over, there were 104.2 males.

The median income for a household in the CDP was $16,375, and the median income for a family was $4,896. Males had a median income of $31,250 versus $0 for females. The per capita income for the CDP was $17,113.  About 52.2% of families and 28.2% of the population were below the poverty line, including none of those under the age of eighteen or sixty five or over.

References

Census-designated places in Lake County, Florida
Greater Orlando
Census-designated places in Florida